Jean Hardouin (1646 – 3 September 1729), was a French classical scholar. He is most known for his theory that most texts from Antiquity were forgeries.

Biography 
He was born at Quimper in Brittany. Having acquired a taste for literature in his father's book-shop, he sought and obtained admission into the order of the Jesuits in around 1662 (when he was 16). In Paris, where he went to study theology. He ultimately became librarian of the Lycée Louis-le-Grand in 1683, and he died there.

His first published work was an edition of Themistius (1684), which included no fewer than thirteen new orations. On the advice of Jean Garnier (1612–1681) he undertook to edit the Natural History of Pliny for the Dauphin series, a task which he completed in five years. Aside from editorial work, he became interested in numismatics, and published several learned works on this subject, all marked by a determination to be different from other interpreters. His works on this topic include: Nummi antiqui populorum et urbium illustrati (1684), Antirrheticus de nummis antiquis coloniarum et municipiorum (1689), and Chronologia Veteris Testamenti ad vulgatam versionem exacta et nummis illustrata (1696).

Ideology 
Hardouin was appointed by the ecclesiastical authorities to supervise the Conciliorum collectio regia maxima (1715); but he was accused of suppressing important documents and including apocryphal ones, and by the order of the parlement of Paris (then in conflict with the Jesuits) the publication of the work was delayed. After his death a collection of works Opera varia appeared in Amsterdam 1733.

It is, however, as the originator of a variety of unorthodox theories that Hardouin is now best remembered. Hardouin recalled that in August 1690, he began to suspect some of the works of Augustine of Hippo and his contemporaries of being inauthentic, and by May 1692 he had "uncovered everything." Hardouin came to believe that for the first thirteen hundred years of Christianity, Christian doctrine had been handed down by an unwritten oral tradition, and books on theology had not been written; in the 14th century, all of the works of the Church Fathers as well as the medieval Scholastics had been counterfeited by "atheist" monks under the direction of a certain "Severus Archontius" (by whom he might have meant Frederick II) for the sake of introducing heresy into the Church.

Accordingly, Hardouin believed the entire history of the Church from Pope Linus to the invention of the printing press to be fictitious; asked why he had written his history of the ecumenical councils despite believing that none of the councils prior to the Council of Trent had taken place, he replied "God and I only know." Hardouin also believed that nearly all ancient secular literature was likewise manufactured to support the fraud; Hardouin only admitted the authenticity of the works of Homer, Herodotus, Cicero (whom he later replaced with Plautus), and Pliny the Elder, as well as the Eclogues and Georgics of Virgil and the Satires and Epistles of Horace (but not the other works of Virgil or Horace). Hardouin published these theories in his Chronologiae ex nummis antiquis restitutae (1696) and Prolegomena ad censuram veterum scriptorum (1729). According to Hardouin, all other pre-modern literature was written in the same style of Greek or of Latin, far inferior to the style of the few genuine classical authors, which proved that all these works were composed in the same era, and he took any factual contradictions with the works he admitted as genuine as proof of the forgers' ignorance.

He denied the genuineness of most ancient works of art, coins and inscriptions, and declared that the New Testament was originally written in Latin, contrary to the received view that the Latin Vulgate edition of the New Testament was translated from Greek. The Prolegomena were translated by Edwin Johnson and published by Angus and Robertson, Sydney 1909, with a noteworthy preface of Edward A. Petherick.

In a four-volume manuscript critical discussion of the Summa theologiae, Hardouin denied Thomas Aquinas' authorship of the work, and questioned the existence of Aquinas himself. Hardouin also perceived anachronisms in Dante's Purgatorio, in notes published in Paris 1727, which was edited with an English commentary in London 1847 by C. F. Molini. The historian Isaac-Joseph Berruyer had his Histoire du peuple de Dieu condemned for having followed this theory, which has a modern heir in the Russian mathematician Anatoly Timofeevich Fomenko, whose conclusions being based on proprietary methods of statistical textual analysis and computational astronomy are even more radical, but considered to be pseudoscientific.

Although Hardouin has been called "pathological", he was only an extreme example of a general critical trend of his time, following authors like Baruch Spinoza, Thomas Hobbes or Jean Daillé, who had started to identify and discard mistaken attributions or datings of medieval documents or Church writings.

References

Further reading 
 Augustin de Backer, Bibliothèque des écrivains de la Compagnie de Jesus (1853).
 English Translation of The Prolegomena

External link

1646 births
1729 deaths
French classical scholars
17th-century French Jesuits
18th-century French Jesuits
Writers from Quimper
Pseudohistorians
Proponents of alternative chronologies
17th-century Latin-language writers
18th-century Latin-language writers